Kesselman is a German and Yiddish surname, literally "kettle-man". It possibly refers to one who made or repaired metal cooking vessels.

The surname may refer to:
Carl Kesselman, American computing expert
Wendy Kesselman, American playwright

German-language surnames
Yiddish-language surnames

Occupational surnames